Krzysztof Gierczyński (born 23 January 1976) is a former Polish volleyball player, a member of Poland men's national volleyball team in 1997–2008, a participant of the Olympic Games Beijing 2008.

Career

Clubs
In 2012 moved to Jastrzębski Węgiel. In season 2012/3013 won bronze medal of Polish Championship. In 2013/2014 the club advanced to the Final Four of the Champions League in Ankara and after defeating VC Zenit Kazan won the bronze medal. His team beat ZAKSA Kędzierzyn-Koźle in last matches in the fight for a medal. Jastrzębski Węgiel ended season with second bronze, this time of Polish Championship. On June 25, 2015, he ended up his sports career.

Sporting achievements

Clubs

CEV Champions League
  2013/2014 - with Jastrzębski Węgiel

Challenge Cup
  2011/2012 - with AZS Częstochowa

National championships
 1996/1997  Polish Championship, with Morze Bałtyk Szczecin
 1997/1998  Polish Championship, with Morze Bałtyk Szczecin
 2002/2003  Polish Championship, with AZS Częstochowa
 2003/2004  Polish Championship, with AZS Częstochowa
 2004/2005  Polish Championship, with AZS Częstochowa
 2007/2008  Polish Cup, with AZS Częstochowa
 2007/2008  Polish Championship, with AZS Częstochowa
 2008/2009  Polish Championship, with Asseco Resovia Rzeszów
 2009/2010  Polish Championship, with Asseco Resovia Rzeszów
 2012/2013  Polish Championship, with Jastrzębski Węgiel
 2013/2014  Polish Championship, with Jastrzębski Węgiel

References

External links
 PlusLiga profile

1976 births
Living people
People from Gubin, Poland
Sportspeople from Lubusz Voivodeship
Polish men's volleyball players
Olympic volleyball players of Poland
Volleyball players at the 2008 Summer Olympics
Resovia (volleyball) players
AZS Częstochowa players
Jastrzębski Węgiel players
Outside hitters